Self Defense (also known as Siege) is a 1983 Canadian action-thriller-film directed by Paul Donovan and starring Tom Nardini, Brenda Bazinet, Darel Haeny and Terry-David Després.

Plot
A fascist group who call themselves New Order want to set some "new rules" in town while the police in Halifax, Nova Scotia are on strike. They try to scare the patrons of a gay bar, but by accident the owner of the establishment is killed, and the leader of the fascist group then decides to execute all witnesses. One man escapes and takes refuge in an isolated block of flats. The young tenants in the house refuse to hand over the survivor, and the bullies then decide to kill all the residents in the house. This turns out to be not so easy when the young people in the house barricade their apartments and set up traps and arm themselves in order to fight back.

Cast
Tom Nardini ...  Horatio
Brenda Bazinet ...  Barbara
Darel Haeny ...  Chester
Terry-David Després ...  Daniel
Jack Blum ...  Patrick
Keith Knight ...  Steve
Doug Lennox ...  Cabe
Jeff Pustil ...  Goose
Fred Wadden ...  Ian
Gary Dempster ...  Lloyd
Dennis O'Connor ...  Clark
Richard Collins ...  Rosie

Reception
TV Guide said "the film is reminiscent of Assault on Precinct 13, though it is not quite as effective." Canuxploitation called it “an unheralded landmark of Canadian B-film.”

References

External links

1983 films
Canadian action thriller films
English-language Canadian films
1983 action thriller films
1980s action drama films
Homophobia in fiction
Films about violence against LGBT people
Canadian LGBT-related films
LGBT-related drama films
Films shot in Halifax, Nova Scotia
Films set in Nova Scotia
Home invasions in film
Alliance Atlantis films
1983 drama films
Siege films
1983 LGBT-related films
Films directed by Paul Donovan
1980s English-language films
1980s Canadian films